Cyperus hakonensis is a species of sedge that is native to north eastern parts of Asia.

See also 
 List of Cyperus species

References 

hakonensis
Plants described in 1877
Flora of Japan
Flora of China
Flora of Korea
Taxa named by Ludovic Savatier
Taxa named by Adrien René Franchet